Richard Hammond is an adjunct professor at the University of North Carolina at Chapel Hill and the author of the book "The Unknown Universe: The Origin of the Universe, Quantum Gravity, Wormholes, and Other Things Science Still Can't Explain". He also works for the United States Army Research Laboratory as a theoretical physicist. He has authored several academic papers on general relativity and quantum mechanics.

References

Theoretical physicists
Living people
University of North Carolina at Chapel Hill faculty
Year of birth missing (living people)